Osyris lanceolata, also known as African sandalwood, watta bush or Camwood, is used for its scented wood and to extract essential oil. The semi-parasitic plant is found from South Africa to Zimbabwe and east Africa, including Tanzania, Kenya and Uganda; northwest Africa; the southern half of the Iberian Peninsula and Macaronesia. It grows in rocky areas or along the margins of dry forest, but is usually not abundant in any one place.

The wood is overexploited in parts of its range despite legal protection. In Somaliland, the leaves and tender branches of the tree are used for tanning leather.

References

External links

 Osyris lanceolata Hochst. & Steud. ex A. DC., Flora of Zimbabwe

lanceolata
Tannins